A gift basket or fruit basket is typically a gift delivered to the recipient at their home or workplace. A variety of gift baskets exist: some contain fruit; while others might contain dry or canned foods such as tea, crackers and jam; or the basket might include a combination of fruit and dried good items. Gourmet gift baskets typically include exotic fruit, and often include quality cheese and wine, as well as other nonfood items. Gift baskets are often sent for special occasions—such as holidays—or as a thank-you or congratulations gift. In certain occasions, it is given as a sympathy gift or a condolence gift during funerals. In some countries in Asia, people use fruit basket as a decoration. They either eat it after the funeral service where the casket is laid in the cemetery or they leave the fruit baskets at their graves to let the dead rest in peace.

Fruit bouquet

A fruit bouquet is a fruit arrangement in the form of bouquet. The fruit is cut in the shape of flowers and leaves, and is arranged in the container with the help of sticks. A complete arrangement looks like a bouquet of flowers. Typically, a fruit bouquet is delivered to the recipient at their home or workplace.

Often these bouquets will be made to suit the recipients' needs, such as diabetic, vegan, vegetarian, gluten intolerance or wheat intolerance. Common fruit bouquet items include apples, artichokes, avocados, bananas, cheeses, grapes, lychees, mangoes, oranges, papayas, pineapples, pomegranates, strawberries, and Chocolates.

Common contents

Perishable foods

Fruits 
Apples
Avocados
Bananas
Grapes
Mangoes
Oranges
Papayas
Pineapples
Pomegranates
Strawberries
Apple-pears
Blood orange
Cherimoya
Kiwi
Feijoa
Kumquats
Lychee
Passion Fruit
Persimmons
Rambutan
Raspberry
Sapotes
Cantaloupe
Peach

Other Perishable Foods 

Artichokes
Bread
Cheese
Eggs (see Easter basket)

Dry, canned or bottled goods

Champagne
Chocolate
Coffee
Crackers
Honey
Jam or Marmalade
Liqueur
Nuts
Sparkling beverage or premium/organic soft drinks
Tea
Wine

Non-edibles
Cash
Cut flowers
Plants
Promotional merchandise
Stuffed animals

Literature

See also
Flower bouquet
Vegetable bouquet
Floral design

References

Giving
Bundled products or services